Nuala Quinn-Barton (born March 1952) is a independent film producer, artist, talent manager and former fashion model from Newry, Northern Ireland. She is best known for producing films such as Homecoming (2009), The Third Half (2012), Goodbye Christopher Robin (2017), and for managing the careers of her daughter, actress Mischa Barton, actress Kelly Lynn Reiter, producer Taheim Bryan, and best-selling writer Ted Lazaris. She is married to Paul Marsden Barton.

Early life and career
Nuala Quinn was born in Newry and spent her early years on her mother's family farm in Ballintober, County Roscommon, Republic of Ireland. She went to London for an education at Our Lady of Sion School, Sion Manning School and Lucie Clayton Charm Academy. Nuala was a fashion model for Lucie Clayton and the Gavin Robinson Agency in the late 1970s. During that period she worked in-house for several fashion companies including Chanel in Paris.

She married Paul Marsden Barton, a foreign exchange broker, in June 1975 at St Osmund's Roman Catholic Church in Barnes London. They have three daughters: Zoe Barton, a London barrister; Hania Barton, a writer and real estate manager; and Mischa Barton, an actress. She has two grandchildren from her eldest daughter Zoe's marriage to Ian Taylor.

The family moved from London to New York City in the early ’90s and Nuala built relationships with New York Theatre Workshop, the Public Theater  The Circle in the Square, and Lincoln Center Theater   and encouraged her daughter, actress Mischa Barton, through her passion for theatre in New York City. She has been her mentor and talent manager throughout her early career during her rise to fame, responsible for the casting of her daughter including The O.C., a popular Television Series on the Fox Network, The Sixth Sense  and the Notting Hill Film amongst others.

Filmography

References
1 "Date Of Birth". CompanyCheck. Retrieved 26 August 2021.
2•  ^ "Review: 'Homecoming'". Variety. Ronnie Scheib. 15 July 2009.
3•  ^ "U.K. sets Pooh scribe saga". Variety. Dave McNary. 7 May 2010.
4•  ^ "Actress Mischa Barton being in Northern Ireland really touches my soul". Belfast Telegraph. Maureen Coleman INM. 2 October 2012.
5•  ^ "Irish American actress Mischa Barton says Ireland is a dream come true". IrishCentral. Michille Smith. 5 October 2012.
6 In 'Slavs!' Kushner Creates Tragic Burlesque https://www.nytimes.com/1994/12/18/theater/sunday-view-in-slavs-kushner-creates-tragic-burlesque.html Dec 18th 1994
7Prisoners in Their Home, Facing the Twin Ravages of Plague and Power https://www.nytimes.com/1997/03/10/theater/prisoners-in-their-home-facing-the-twin-ravages-of-plague-and-power.html March10th 1997
8 Twelve Dreams https://variety.com/1995/legit/reviews/twelve-dreams-1200441964/ June 9, 1995
9•‘The O.C.’: THR’s 2003 Review https://www.hollywoodreporter.com/tv/tv-news/oc-review-first-episode-2003-1132163/ The Hollywood Reporter 5 August 2003
10•A Chillingly Intense 'Sense'  https://www.washingtonpost.com/wp-srv/style/movies/reviews/sixthsensehowe.htm August 6, 1999
11. Notting Hill review – a year-round treat, not just for Valentine's
https://www.theguardian.com/film/2019/feb/14/notting-hill-review-richard-curtis-hugh-grant-julia-roberts  The Guardian February 14, 2019
12 September 11 attacks
https://www.britannica.com/event/September-11-attacks

Living people
British filmmakers
1952 births
People from Newry